Ronald Weigel (born 8 August 1959 in Hildburghausen, Thuringia) is a German athlete and Olympic medal winner.  In the 1980s through the middle of the 1990s he represented East Germany (and then Germany after 1990) as one of world's best in race walking.

His first big win came in 1983 when he won the World title in the 50 km walk.  At the Summer Olympic games he won a silver medal in the 20 km walk as well as a silver and a bronze medal in the 50 km walk.  He is the only German sportsman to have won Olympic medals in both walking disciplines at the Games.

He was unable to participate in the 1984 Summer Olympic Games because of the East German boycott, when he was the overwhelming favourite to win.

Weigel represented ASK Vorwärts Potsdam, and after reunification he went to OSC Potsdam and then LAC Halensee.  He trained with Hans-Joachim Pathus.  During his competitive years he was 1.77 meters tall and weighed 62 kilograms.

Results in detail
1983, World championship, 50 km walk: 1st place (3:43:08 hours)
1987, World championship, 50 km walk: 2nd place (3:41:30 hours)
1988, Summer Olympic games, 20 km walk: 2nd place (1:20:00 hours); 50 km walk: 2nd place (3:38:56 hours)
1990, European championship, 50 km walk: 9th place (4:04:36 hours)

At the 1986 European championships he was disqualified in the 50 km walk.  At the 1991 World championship he retired from the course, and at the 1995 World championship he was disqualified.

Life outside sport
Weigel started in the sport as a student in his hometown of Hildburghausen and was found to have natural talent.  In 1973 he became the East German student champion, and in 1977 he was second at the Junior European championship.

As a member of the Army sports club he was Hauptmann in the NVA.  After reunification he freely admitted to having worked for the Stasi and was then let go from the sports group of the Bundeswehr without notice.

In 1997, Weigel took a position as the Australian national coach in Canberra.  He trained the Australian Nathan Deakes who won the bronze medal in the 20 km walk at the 2004 Summer Olympic Games and was the 2007 World Champion over 50 km walk

After the games, Weigel went back to Germany and took over from his previous trainer, Hans-Joachim Pathus as the German national trainer.  His admitted work for the East German security service was taken into consideration, but was not deemed to be a hindrance in hiring him.

References

External links

1959 births
Living people
East German male racewalkers
Athletes (track and field) at the 1988 Summer Olympics
Olympic athletes of East Germany
Olympic silver medalists for East Germany
Athletes (track and field) at the 1992 Summer Olympics
Athletes (track and field) at the 1996 Summer Olympics
Olympic athletes of Germany
Olympic bronze medalists for Germany
World record setters in athletics (track and field)
People from Hildburghausen
German athletics coaches
Australian Institute of Sport coaches
World Athletics Championships medalists
Sportspeople from Thuringia
Medalists at the 1992 Summer Olympics
Medalists at the 1988 Summer Olympics
Olympic silver medalists in athletics (track and field)
Olympic bronze medalists in athletics (track and field)
People of the Stasi
National People's Army military athletes
World Athletics Race Walking Team Championships winners
World Athletics Championships winners